Dasheng may refer to:

Places in China
Dasheng Town, Yubei District, Chongqing Municipality
Dasheng Town (Dong'an County, Yong'an City, Hunan Province
Dasheng Town (Anqiu County, Weifang City, Shandong Province
Dasheng Village, Xuefeng Subdistrict,  Dongkou County, Shaoyang City, Hunan Province
Dasheng Village, Ganzhu Town, Guangchang County, Fuzhou City, Jiangxi Province

People
Emperor Dasheng, formerly used as a posthumous name of Helibo (1039–1092)
 (born 1968), Chinese film director nominated for the Golden Rooster Award for Best Director on multiple occasions